The discography of Devo, an American new wave band formed in 1973, consists of 25 singles and 9 studio albums. Devo was founded by Gerald Casale, Bob Lewis and Mark Mothersbaugh. Devo currently consists of brothers Mark Mothersbaugh (synthesizers, guitar, lead vocals) and Bob Mothersbaugh (lead guitar, lead and backing vocals), Gerald Casale (bass guitar, keyboards, lead and backing vocals), Josh Hager (rhythm guitar, keyboards) and Josh Freese (drums). The band rose to prominence in the US during the new wave era with their single "Whip It". The band have released nine studio albums, ten extended plays, fourteen compilation albums, ten live albums, one soundtrack album and twenty-five singles.

Before signing a record contract with Warner Bros. in the US, the band released several singles on the independent Stiff Records label that charted in the UK. Devo followed up with their debut full-length album Q: Are We Not Men? A: We Are Devo! in July 1978. The album reached No. 12 in the UK and  No. 78 in the US. In 1980, Devo released Freedom of Choice, which went Platinum in the US and Gold in Canada, making it their highest selling album. Their 1981 follow-up, New Traditionalists, peaked at No. 23 on the American charts and was their final album to chart in the UK. Devo's chart success slowly fell throughout the decade until they released their apparently final studio album, Smooth Noodle Maps, in 1990; it failed to chart in either the US or the UK.

In 1996, Devo released a multimedia CD-ROM adventure game, Devo Presents Adventures of the Smart Patrol, through Inscape. Members of Devo also began recording together under different aliases, including the surf rock-influenced the Wipeouters and Jihad Jerry & the Evildoers. From 1990 through 2009, no new albums under the Devo name were released. However, a new single, "Watch Us Work It", was released as a digital download in 2007 and as part of a 12-inch EP in 2008. A new studio album, Something for Everybody, was released on June 15, 2010.

A tribute album to Devo, entitled We Are Not Devo, was released by Centipede Records in 1997 and featured various artists—including the Aquabats, Voodoo Glow Skulls and the Vandals—covering some of the band's songs.

Albums

Studio albums

Live albums

Soundtracks

Compilation albums

Box sets

Extended plays

Singles

A "Whip It" and "Freedom of Choice" charted together with "Gates of Steel" as a triple-sided single on the Billboard Hot Dance/Disco chart.
B "Working in the Coal Mine" additionally charted at number 53 on the Billboard Mainstream Rock Tracks chart.
C "Through Being Cool" charted together with "Jerkin' Back 'n' Forth" and "Going Under" as a triple-sided single on the Billboard Hot Dance/Disco chart.
D "That's Good" charted together with "Speed Racer" as a double-sided hit on the Billboard Hot Dance/Disco chart.
E "Here to Go" and "Disco Dancer" additionally charted on the Billboard Hot Dance Music/Maxi-Singles Sales chart at numbers 44 and 40 respectively.
F "Post Post-Modern Man" additionally charted at #7 on the Billboard Modern Rock Tracks chart.

Other releases
This section is intended to be a compendium of the many properly released tracks that Devo has recorded for TV and film soundtracks, video games and various artists compilation albums, as well as rare remixes and other oddities.  It does not list any of the tracks that appeared on proper studio albums and singles, nor any tracks from collections of previously unreleased songs (such as the Hardcore Devo compilations) or illicit bootleg releases.

Filmography

Video releases
1979: The Men Who Make the Music
1984: We're All Devo
1993: The Complete Truth About De-Evolution
2003: Devo Live
2004: Live in the Land of the Rising Sun
2005: Devo Live 1980
2009: Live at the London HMV Forum – exclusive to Ultra Devo-lux Limited Edition box set
2014: Butch Devo and the Sundance Gig – paired with The Men Who Make the Music
2015: Hardcore Devo Live!

Film appearances
1976: The Truth About De-Evolution
1980: Pray TV – appearing as "Dove"
1982: Human Highway
1982: Urgh! A Music War
1983: Entrées de secours (short)
1990: The Spirit of '76
1998: The Rugrats Movie
2011: Shut Up, Little Man!

TV appearances
1978: Saturday Night Live
1979: Chorus
1979: Don Kirshner's Rock Concert
1980, 1981: Fridays
1980: American Bandstand
1980: The Merv Griffin Show
1981: Evening Magazine
1982: Square Pegs
1982: Late Night with David Letterman
1996: Ellen
2019: Chi Chi & Devo – documentary for the Golf Channel

References
General

Specific

Notes

External links
 

Discography
Discographies of American artists
Electronic music discographies
Pop music group discographies
Rock music group discographies
New wave discographies